Mohorje (in older sources also Mahorje) is a small settlement on the Rute Plateau in the hills west of Velike Lašče in central Slovenia. The entire Municipality of Velike Lašče is now included in the Central Slovenia Statistical Region. It is part of the traditional region of Lower Carniola.

References

External links

Mohorje on Geopedia

Populated places in the Municipality of Velike Lašče